Joachim Van Damme (born 23 July 1991) is a Belgian footballer who plays in central defence as well as central midfield. He plays for Beveren on loan from Standard Liège.

Cocaine suspension
Van Damme tested positive for cocaine on 16 January 2016 and was suspended by the Flemish doping tribunal for two years, until 29 January 2018. KV Mechelen subsequently cancelled his contract. As a free player, his former club Waasland-Beveren offered him a contract in May 2017. End of November 2017, although still under suspension and unavailable to play for his club, Van Damme signed a contract extension at Waasland-Beveren keeping him at the club until June 2020.

On 11 January 2022, Van Damme moved to Standard Liège. On 19 August 2022, Van Damme returned to Beveren on a season-long loan.

Honours
Mechelen
 Belgian Cup: 2018–19

References

External links
 

1991 births
Living people
Association football defenders
Association football midfielders
Belgian footballers
Belgium youth international footballers
K.V. Mechelen players
Standard Liège players
S.K. Beveren players
Belgian Pro League players
Challenger Pro League players
Flemish sportspeople